Zəngəran (also, Zangyaran and Zengyaran’) is a village in the Yardymli Rayon of Azerbaijan.  The village forms part of the municipality of Hamarkənd.

References 

Populated places in Yardimli District